The Melanesian flycatcher (Myiagra caledonica) is a species of bird in the monarch-flycatcher family Monarchidae. The species is found on islands in Melanesia.

Taxonomy and systematics
It is closely related to the Vanikoro flycatcher. Alternate names for the Melanesian flycatcher include broad-billed flycatcher, Caledonian flycatcher, Caledonian Myiagra flycatcher, Melanesian broadbill, Melanesian Myiagra, New Caledonian flycatcher and New Caledonian Myiagra flycatcher. The alternate name "broad-billed flycatcher" should not be confused with the species of the same name, Myiagra ruficollis.

Subspecies
Five subspecies are recognized:
 M. c. caledonica - Bonaparte, 1857: Found on New Caledonia
 M. c. viridinitens - Gray, GR, 1859: Originally described as a separate species. Found on the Loyalty Islands
 M. c. melanura - Gray, GR, 1860: Originally described as a separate species. Found on southern Vanuatu
 M. c. marinae - Salomonsen, 1934: Found on northern and central Vanuatu
 M. c. occidentalis - Mayr, 1931: Originally described as a subspecies of the Vanikoro flycatcher. Found on Rennell Island (south-eastern Solomon Islands)

Description
The plumage is sexually dimorphic.

References

Myiagra
Birds described in 1857
Taxa named by Charles Lucien Bonaparte
Taxonomy articles created by Polbot